Vera King Farris (July 18, 1938 – November 28, 2009 in Pomona, New Jersey) was the third president of the Richard Stockton College of New Jersey from May 25, 1983 to June 3, 2003. She was the first female African-American president of a New Jersey public college and one of the first in the nation.

A scientist with a doctorate in zoology, she taught at State University of New York at Stony Brook and Brockport, and the University of Michigan. She advanced into administrative positions, serving as vice president for academic affairs at Kean University.

Early life and education
Farris was a native of Atlantic City, New Jersey and attended Atlantic City High School, graduating third in the class of 1954. She attended Tuskegee Institute (now Tuskegee University), graduating with a degree in biology in 1959. She later earned master’s and doctorate degrees in zoology from the University of Massachusetts Amherst.

Academic career
Farris held administrative and teaching positions at the State University of New York at Stony Brook and Brockport, and the University of Michigan.

College administration
Farris served at Kean College (now Kean University) as vice president for academic affairs.

In 1983, she was selected as president of Richard Stockton College of New Jersey, serving until 2003. According to the college, she was the first female African-American president of a New Jersey public college, and one of the first in the nation.  Farris directed the college through a period of expansion and change, increasing enrollment and adding to facilities. She emphasized academic excellence and is credited with leading the College to become a "nationally ranked institution, and increasing SAT scores, minority enrollment and retention."

As a professional scientist, she supported major initiatives in sustainability, such as "one of the world’s largest geothermal heating and cooling systems."  Capital construction during her term included the Sports Center, West Quad Health Sciences Building, and the Arts and Sciences Building, designed by the internationally known architect, Michael Graves. The college also adopted practices to reduce consumption of fossil fuels. Construction of residential buildings increased the appeal of the campus for students.

Farris established "one of the nation's first Holocaust Resource Centers and the first Master's program in Holocaust and Genocide Studies." She also endowed a chair in the department in her mother's name.

Civic life
Farris was the first African-American woman selected for the Board of Directors of Flagstar Companies, owner of Denny's Restaurants. She was a member of Seaview Baptist Church in Linwood, New Jersey for more than 25 years.

Farris retired to Galloway Township, New Jersey. Upon her retirement in 2003, the College renamed its main road "Vera King Farris Drive" in her honor. She died November 28, 2009 at the age of 71 after a brief illness and is buried in Germania Cemetery in Galloway Township.

Legacy and honors
1992, named New Jersey Woman of the Year.
1994, named New Jersey Policymaker of the Year by Executive Women of New Jersey. 
Through the years, she was awarded multiple honorary doctorate degrees from other educational institutions.
2003, Stockton College named its main road as "Vera King Farris Drive" in her honor.
2003- Stockton college paid 75k to settle a sexual harassment lawsuit after a male vice president rejected her advances. https://www.nytimes.com/2003/05/25/education/college-pays-75000-to-settle-a-sexual-harassment-case.html

References

https://www.nytimes.com/2003/05/25/education/college-pays-75000-to-settle-a-sexual-harassment-case.html

External links
"Vera King Farris / A true presence", The Press of Atlantic City (Editorial), November 29, 2009.
"In Memoriam – Dr. Vera King Farris", Saatkamp, Jr., Dr. Herman J., Office of the President, Richard Stockton College of New Jersey. Accessed November 30, 2009.
Obituary, The Press of Atlantic City, December 2, 2009.

1938 births
2009 deaths
Atlantic City High School alumni
People from Atlantic City, New Jersey
People from Galloway Township, New Jersey
Baptists from New Jersey
Stockton University
University of Michigan faculty
Stony Brook University faculty
University of Massachusetts Amherst alumni
Tuskegee University alumni
20th-century Baptists